Toffifee (known in the United States as Toffifay)  is a German brand of caramel candies, owned by the Berlin-based German company August Storck KG.  Toffifee are caramel cups containing nougat, caramel and a hazelnut, topped with a chocolate button.  They are sold in 4, 12, 15, 24, 30, 48 and 96 piece boxes. 

First sold in West Germany in 1983, Toffifee were marketed as a product "for the whole family". By 2016, Toffifee were being sold in over 100 countries. In the United States, Toffifee is marketed with an alternative spelling of "Toffifay" and a white package design. Elsewhere in the world, including in Canada and Europe, the brand retains its original spelling and brown box design.

See also
 List of confectionery brands

References

External links
Toffifee Homepage
August Storck KG Homepage

August Storck brands
German brands
Brand name confectionery
Toffee
German confectionery